The 2015 FIVB Volleyball World League was the 26th edition of the annual men's international volleyball tournament, played from 16 May to 19 July 2015. The tournament featured a record 32 participating countries from 5 confederations. The teams were divided into 3 groups and 8 pools. The Group 1 Final Round which served as the volleyball test event of the 2016 Summer Olympics was held in Rio de Janeiro, Brazil.

Qualification
All 28 teams of the 2014 edition directly qualified.
 and  qualified through the 2014 European League.
 qualified through the 2014 Asian Cup.
 qualified through the 2013 African Championship.
 replaced , who withdrew from the tournament.

Format
It will be the first time the World League will feature 32 teams, having had 28 teams in 2014, 18 teams in 2013 and 16 teams from 2001–03 and 2006–12. The World League featured 8 teams in its inaugural year in 1990, 10 in 1991 and then 12 from 1992–2000 and 2004–05.
During the Intercontinental Round, Pools A to E will play double home and away matches, for a total of 12 matches per team. Pool F to H will feature two stand-alone tournaments.
The last ranked team of Group 1 after the Intercontinental Round could be relegated if the winners of the Group 2 Final Round can meet the promotion requirements set by the FIVB.

Pools composition
The pools of Group 1 were announced on 18 July 2014, while the pools of Group 2 and 3 were announced on 31 October 2014. After Germany withdrew, Japan replaced them in Pool D, while Venezuela took Japan's spot in Pool H.

Competition schedule

Squads
There are 25 players in team rosters. Maximum of 12 regular players and maximum of 2 liberos can be selected to play in each week. The full rosters of 25 players of each team can be seen in the article below.

Pool standing procedure
 Number of matches won
 Match points
 Sets ratio
 Points ratio
 If the tie continues as per the point ratio between two teams, the priority will be given to the team which won the last match between them. When the tie in points ratio is between three or more teams, a new classification of these teams in the terms of points 1, 2 and 3 will be made taking into consideration only the matches in which they were opposed to each other.

Match won 3–0 or 3–1: 3 match points for the winner, 0 match points for the loser
Match won 3–2: 2 match points for the winner, 1 match point for the loser

Intercontinental round
All times are local.

Group 1
The Group 1 Final Round hosts Brazil, the top two teams from Pool A and B and the winners of the Group 2 Final Round will qualify for the Group 1 Final Round. If Brazil finishes as one of the top two teams in Pool A, Pool A will send its top three teams.

Pool A

|}

Week 3
Venue:  Adelaide Arena, Adelaide, Australia
Venue:  Mineirinho Arena, Belo Horizonte, Brazil

|}

Week 4
Venue:  Ginásio Adib Moyses Dib, São Bernardo do Campo, Brazil
Venue:  Adriatic Arena, Pesaro, Italy
Venue:  Land Rover Arena, Bologna, Italy

|}

Week 5
Venue:  SPC Vojvodina, Novi Sad, Serbia
Venue:  Pala Arrex, Jesolo, Italy
Venue:  Pionir Hall, Belgrade, Serbia
Venue:  PalaOlimpia, Verona, Italy

|}

Week 6
Venue:  SPC Vojvodina, Novi Sad, Serbia
Venue:  Foro Italico Tennis Center Court, Rome, Italy
Venue:  Pionir Hall, Belgrade, Serbia
Venue:  Nelson Mandela Forum, Florence, Italy

|}

Week 7
Venue:  SPC Vojvodina, Novi Sad, Serbia
Venue:  Sydney Olympic Park Sports Centre, Sydney, Australia
Venue:  Pionir Hall, Belgrade, Serbia

|}

Week 8
Venue:  Ginásio Aecim Tocantins, Cuiabá, Brazil
Venue:  State Basketball Centre, Wantirna South, Australia

|}

Pool B

|}

Week 3
Venue:  Ergo Arena, Gdańsk, Poland
Venue:  Galen Center, Los Angeles, United States

|}

Week 4
Venue:  Hala Sportowa Częstochowa, Częstochowa, Poland
Venue:  Walter Pyramid, Long Beach, United States

|}

Week 5
Venue:  Sears Centre, Hoffman Estates, United States
Venue:  Kazan Volleyball Centre, Kazan, Russia

|}

Week 6
Venue:  Kazan Volleyball Centre, Kazan, Russia
Venue:  Azadi Indoor Stadium, Tehran, Iran

|}

Week 7
Venue:  Yantarny Sports Complex, Kaliningrad, Russia
Venue:  Azadi Indoor Stadium, Tehran, Iran

|}

Week 8
Venue:  Azadi Indoor Stadium, Tehran, Iran
Venue:  Tauron Arena, Kraków, Poland

|}

Group 2
The Group 2 Final Round hosts Bulgaria and the winners of Pool C, D and E will qualify for the Group 2 Final Round. If Bulgaria finishes first in Pool C, Pool C will send its top two teams.

Pool C
 

|}

Week 1
Venue:  Stampede Corral, Calgary, Canada

|}

Week 3
Venue:  Polideportivo Municipal Gustavo Torito Rodríguez, San Martín, Argentina
Venue:  Arena Botevgrad, Botevgrad, Bulgaria

|}

Week 4
Venue:  Scotiabank Centre, Halifax, Canada
Venue:  Coliseo de la Ciudad Deportiva, Havana, Cuba

|}

Week 5
Venue:  Consolidated Credit Union Place, Summerside, Canada
Venue:  Coliseo de la Ciudad Deportiva, Havana, Cuba

|}

Week 6
Venue:  Coliseo de la Ciudad Deportiva, Havana, Cuba
Venue:  Polideportivo Delmi, Salta, Argentina

|}

Week 7
Venue:  Microestadio Presidente Juan Domingo Perón, González Catán, Argentina
Venue:  Palace of Culture and Sports, Varna, Bulgaria

|}

Week 8
Venue:  Palace of Culture and Sports, Varna, Bulgaria

|}

Pool D

|}

Week 3
Venue:  Suwon Gymnasium, Suwon, South Korea
Venue:  Momotaro Arena, Okayama, Japan

|}

Week 4
Venue:  Yu Gwan-sun Gymnasium, Cheonan, South Korea
Venue:  Shimadzu Arena, Kyoto, Japan

|}

Week 5
Venue:  Salle Frédéric Lawson-Body, Poitiers, France
Venue:  Suwon Gymnasium, Suwon, South Korea
Venue:  Salle Pierre Dumortier, Tourcoing, France

|}

Week 6
Venue:  Budvar Arena, České Budějovice, Czech Republic
Venue:  Osaka Municipal Central Gymnasium, Osaka, Japan

|}

Week 7
Venue:  Salle Robert Grenon, Tours, France
Venue:  Home Credit Arena, Liberec, Czech Republic
Venue:  Kindarena, Rouen, France

|}

Week 8
Venue:  Palais des Sports Jacques Chaban Delmas, Castelnau-le-Lez, France
Venue:  Opava Sports Hall, Opava, Czech Republic
Venue:  Brest Arena, Brest, France

|}

Pool E

|}

Week 1
Venue:  Centro de Desportos e Congressos de Matosinhos, Matosinhos, Portugal

|}

Week 2
Venue:  Tampere Ice Stadium, Tampere, Finland

|}

Week 3
Venue:  Sportcampus Lange Munte, Kortrijk, Belgium

|}

Week 4
Venue:  Vaasa Arena, Vaasa, Finland
Venue:  Maaspoort Sports and Events, 's-Hertogenbosch, Netherlands

|}

Week 5
Venue:  Topsportcentrum Almere, Almere, Netherlands
Venue:  Country Hall Ethias Liège, Liège, Belgium

|}

Week 6
Venue:  MartiniPlaza, Groningen, Netherlands

|}

Week 7
Venue:  Barona Areena, Espoo, Finland
Venue:  Pavilhão Desportivo Municipal da Póvoa de Varzim, Póvoa de Varzim, Portugal

|}

Week 8
Venue:  Lotto Arena, Antwerp, Belgium
Venue:  Pavilhão Desportivo Municipal da Póvoa de Varzim, Póvoa de Varzim, Portugal

|}

Group 3
The Group 3 Final Round hosts Slovakia and the winners of Pool F, G and H will qualify for the Group 3 Final Round. If Slovakia finishes first in Pool G, Pool G will send its top two teams.

Pool F

|}

Week 5
Venue:  Morača Sports Center, Podgorica, Montenegro

|}

Week 6
Venue:  TVF Burhan Felek Sport Hall, Istanbul, Turkey

|}

Pool G

|}

Week 5
Venue:  Auditorio de la Gente, Tepic, Mexico

|}

Week 6
Venue:  Alexandreio Melathron Nick Galis Hall, Thessaloniki, Greece

|}

Pool H

|}

Week 5
Venue:  Sports Palace Taraz-Arena, Taraz, Kazakhstan

|}

Week 6
Venue:  Cairo Stadium Indoor Hall 2, Cairo, Egypt

|}

Final round

Group 3
Venue:  Aegon Arena, Bratislava, Slovakia
All times are Central European Summer Time (UTC+02:00).

Final four (Week 8)

Semifinals

|}

3rd place match

|}

Final

|}

Group 2
Venue:  Palace of Culture and Sports, Varna, Bulgaria
All times are Eastern European Summer Time (UTC+03:00).

Final four (Week 9)

Semifinals

|}

3rd place match

|}

Final

|}

Group 1
Venue:  Ginásio do Maracanãzinho, Rio de Janeiro, Brazil
All times are Brasília Time (UTC−03:00).

Pool play (Week 10)

Pool I

|}

|}

Pool J

|}

|}

Final four (Week 10)

Semifinals

|}

3rd place match

|}

Final

|}

Final standing

Awards

Most Valuable Player
  Earvin N'Gapeth
Best Setter
  Benjamin Toniutti
Best Outside Spikers
  Earvin N'Gapeth
  Michał Kubiak

Best Middle Blockers
  Maxwell Holt
  Srećko Lisinac
Best Opposite Spiker
  Aleksandar Atanasijević
Best Libero
  Paweł Zatorski

Prize money

Prize Money for the Final Standing
 Champions – $1,000,000
 Runners-up – $500,000
 3rd place – $300,000
 4th place – $150,000
 5th place – $75,000 (2 teams)

Prize Money for the Awards
 Most Valuable Player – $30,000
 Best Setter – $10,000
 Best Outside Spiker – $10,000 (2 players)
 Best Middle Blocker – $10,000 (2 players)
 Best Opposite Spiker – $10,000
 Best Libero – $10,000

Statistics
The statistics of each group follows the vis reports P2 and P3. The statistics include 6 volleyball skills, serve, receive, set, spike, block, and dig. The table below shows the top 5 ranked players in each skill plus top scorers as of 6 July 2015.

Best scorers
The best scorers determined by players who scored points from spike, block, and serve.

Best spikers
The best spikers determined by players who successfully spike in percentage (%success).

Best blockers
The best scorers determined by players who had the most numbers of stuff block divided by numbers of sets which his team played (average stuff block/set).

Best servers
The best scorers determined by players who had the most numbers of ace serve divided by numbers of sets which his team played (average ace serve/set).

Best setters
The best scorers determined by players who had the most numbers of running set divided by numbers of sets which his team played (average running set/set).

Best diggers
The best scorers determined by players who had the most numbers of excellent dig divided by numbers of sets which his team played (average excellent dig/set).

Best receivers
The best scorers determined by numbers of excellent receive minus fault receive in percentage (%efficient).

References

External links
Official website
Final Standing
Awards
Prize Money
Statistics of Group 1 Final Round
Statistics of Group 2
Statistics of Group 3

2015
FIVB World League
Volleyball